Wilson Connie Day (December 30, 1897 – June 23, 1961) was a Negro league infielder for several years before the founding of the first Negro National League, and in its first few seasons.

References

External links
 and Baseball-Reference Black Baseball stats and Seamheads

St. Louis Giants players
Indianapolis ABCs players
Indianapolis ABCs (1931–1933) players
Bacharach Giants players
Baltimore Black Sox players
Harrisburg Giants players
Richmond Giants players
1897 births
1961 deaths
20th-century African-American sportspeople